Ogden Canyon is a canyon in the Wasatch Range in eastern Weber County, Utah, United States, just east of Ogden.

Geography
The city of Ogden is at the western end of the canyon, and Pineview Dam is on the eastern end.

History

Ogden Canyon is named for the Ogden River, which was named for Peter Skene Ogden, a 19th-century Canadian fur trader and explorer.

Toll gate
The first road through Ogden Canyon was built by Lorin Farr and Isaac Goodale. A toll gate was established in 1860, and from 1865 to 1882 was operated by the Ogden Canyon Road Company. It became a public road in 1882.

Lime kiln
A lime kiln was built in Ogden Canyon in 1865 to provide lime mortar for pioneer construction. Restoration of this kiln was completed in 2008.

Ogden Canyon today
Ogden Canyon is home to several businesses and homes.

The Ogden River Scenic Byway (Utah State Route 39) begins at the mouth of Ogden Canyon.

Ogden marathon
The Ogden marathon goes through Ogden Canyon. It has been an annual event in Ogden since 2001.

See also

 List of canyons and gorges in Utah

References

External links

Canyons and gorges of Utah
Landforms of Weber County, Utah
Wasatch Range
Lime kilns in the United States